2018 Shimizu S-Pulse season.

Squad
As of 10 July 2019.

Note: The official club website lists the club mascot as player #0 and the supporters as player #12.

Out on loan

J1 League

References

External links
 J.League official site

Shimizu S-Pulse
Shimizu S-Pulse seasons